Hoplorana is a genus of longhorn beetles of the subfamily Lamiinae, containing the following species:

subgenus Hoplorana  
 Hoplorana attenuata Fairmaire, 1898
 Hoplorana fuscovestita Breuning, 1970
 Hoplorana mussardi Breuning, 1957
 Hoplorana parterufa Breuning, 1980
 Hoplorana quadricristata Fairmaire, 1896
 Hoplorana vadoni Breuning, 1957

subgenus Parhoplorana
 Hoplorana nigroscutata Fairmaire, 1905

References

Desmiphorini